Mariya Khalatova was a Russian film actress. Honored Artist of the RSFSR.

Selected filmography 
 1914 — Gospodin director flirtuyet
 1915 — Leon Drey
 1915 — After Death (1915 film)

References

External links 
 Мария Халатова on kino-teatr.ru

Russian film actresses